Chrześcijańska Demokracja III Rzeczypospolitej Polskiej (abbreviated ChD III RP or ChDRP) is a Polish political party that was created in 1997 by former Solidarity leader and Polish president Lech Wałęsa. He stood as the party's candidate in the 2000 presidential election but received only 1% of the vote.  The ChDRP never gained substantial support.

See also
Bezpartyjny Blok Wspierania Reform (BBWR)

1997 establishments in Poland
Christian democratic parties in Europe
Catholic political parties
Conservative parties in Poland
Lech Wałęsa
Political parties established in 1997
Political parties in Poland